Pushkalavati or Pushkaravati, and later Shaikhan Dheri, was the capital of the Gandhara kingdom, situated in what is now Pakistan. Its ruins are located on the outskirts of the modern city of Charsadda, in Charsadda District, in the Khyber Pakhtunkhwa, 28 kilometres (17 miles) northeast of Peshawar. Its ruins are located on the banks of Swat River, near its junction with Kabul River, with the earliest archaeological remains from 1400 to 800 BCE in Bala Hisar mound. Pushkalavati became an Achaemenid regional capital around 600 BCE, and it remained an important city through to the 2nd century CE.

Etymology
Pushkalavati (Sanskrit: पुष्कलावती) means "Lotus City" in Sanskrit. According to Hindu mythology as per the Ramayana, it was named Pushkalavati because it was founded by Pushkala, the son of Bharat.

The region around ancient Pushkulavati was recorded in the Zoroastrian Zend Avesta as Vaēkərəta, or the seventh most beautiful place on earth created by Ahura Mazda. It was known as the "crown jewel" of Bactria, and held sway over nearby ancient Taxila'.

Ruins
The ruins of Pushkalavati consist of many stupas and the sites of two ancient cities.

Bala Hisar
Bala Hisar site in this area was first inhabited in the 2nd-millennium BCE. The C14 dating of early deposits in Bala Hisar, bearing "Soapy red"/red burnished ware, is 1420-1160 BCE, and this early phase lasted from 1400 to 800 BCE, the second phase took place until around 500 BCE featuring bowls in typical "grooved" red burnished ware.

In later 6th century BCE, Pushkalavati became the capital of the Achaemenid Gandhara satrapy following the Achaemenid conquest of the Indus Valley. The location was first excavated in 1902 by the archaeologist John Marshall. Sir Mortimer Wheeler conducted some excavations there in 1962, and identified an occupation from the Achaemenid period and various Achaemenid remains.

According to Arrian, the city then surrendered in 327/326 BCE to Alexander the Great, who established a garrison in it.

In 630 CE, Xuanzang visited the area and described a stupa built by Ashoka, which remains unidentified and undiscovered.

Peucela and Shaikhan Dheri

The Bactrian Greeks built a new city (Peucela or Peucelaitis at the mound currently known as Shaikhan Dheri, which lies one kilometre north from Bala Hissar on the other side of Sambor River, the branch of River Jinde. This city was established in the second century BCE until the second century CE, occupied by Parthian, Sakas and Kushans.

Two early Buddhist manuscripts recently found in the region, known as avadanas, written in Gandhari language around 1st century CE (now in the British Library Collection of Gandharan Scrolls) mention the name of the city as Pokhaladi.

In the 2nd century CE, river changed its course and city was flooded. The town moved to the site of the modern village of Rajjar. The last reference to Pushkalavati as Po-shi-ki-lo-fa-ti was recorded in the account of the Chinese pilgrim Hiuen Tsang in 7th century C.E., and subsequently, after the region was conquered by Mahmud of Ghazni in 1001 AD, the name Gandhara was not used anymore, and in all probability the following period is when Pushkalavati became known as Shaikhan Dheri, as deri means mound/hill in Pashto.

The former city's ruins were partly excavated by Ahmad Hasan Dani in 1960s. There are still many mounds at Mir Ziarat, at Rajar and Shahr-i-Napursan which are still unexcavated.

Pushkalavati and Prang

The city of Pushkalavati was situated at the confluence of Swat and Kabul rivers. Three different branches of Kabul river meet there. That specific place is still called Prang and considered sacred. A grand graveyard is situated to the north of Prang where the local people bring their dead for burial. This graveyard is considered to be among the largest graveyards in the world.

Pushkalavati in the Ramayana

In the concluding portion of the (Ramayana) Uttarakhanda or Supplemental Book, the descendants of Rama and his brothers are described as the founders of the great cities and kingdoms which flourished in Western India.

Bharata the brother of Rama had two sons, Taksha and Pushkala. The former founded Taksha-sila or Taxila, to the east of the Indus, and known to Alexander and the Greeks as Taxila. The latter founded Pushkala-vati or Pushkalavati, to the west of the Indus, and known to Alexander and the Greeks as Peukelaotis. Thus according to Hindu legend, the sons of Bharat founded kingdoms that flourished on either side of the Indus river.

See also
 History of Peshawar
 Pushkalavati Museum

References

External links
 Investigating ancient Pushkalavati Pushkalavati Archaeological Research Project
 Map of Gandhara archaeological sites, from the Huntington Collection, Ohio State University (large file)

Archaeological sites in Khyber Pakhtunkhwa
Buddhist sites in Pakistan
Populated places in Charsadda District, Pakistan
Former populated places in Pakistan
Places in the Ramayana
Gandhara